The 2008 Ladbrokes.com World Darts Championship was the 15th World Championship organised by the Professional Darts Corporation since it separated from the British Darts Organisation. The event took place between 17 December 2007 and 1 January 2008 at the Alexandra Palace, London, England.

John Part won his third World Championship, beating the qualifier Kirk Shepherd 7–2 in the final. He joined Phil Taylor, Raymond van Barneveld, Eric Bristow, and John Lowe as the only people to have won more than two world titles, although they have since been joined by Martin Adams and Michael van Gerwen. He is also one of six players to have won the PDC World Darts Championship more than once, along with Phil Taylor, Adrian Lewis, Gary Anderson, Michael van Gerwen and Peter Wright. In addition, he became the first player to have won World Championships in three different venues; the Lakeside, the Circus Tavern and the Alexandra Palace.

Raymond van Barneveld was the defending champion having won the PDC World Championship at the first attempt in an epic final against Taylor in 2007. He was knocked out in the third round with a 4–2 loss to Kevin Painter.

Taylor failed to reach the final of the competition for the first time in PDC World Championship history, after losing 5–4 to Wayne Mardle in the quarter-finals.

In addition to several highly ranked players failing to reach the latter stages of the competition, an argument could be made that this tournament had, statistically, the lowest standard of play from any PDC World Championship this millennium. A distinct lack of quality was exhibited across the draw: no single player achieved a 3-dart average of over 100 in any match in the entire tournament, the highest being John Part's average of 99.06 in his second round match against Mensur Suljovic; additionally, there were only six 3-dart averages of 96 or higher in any match in the entire tournament (see Draw below). Kirk Shepherd, meanwhile, incredibly finished runner-up in the tournament without averaging over 90 in any match he played in the tournament - he is the only player to achieve this feat in any PDC World Championship event this millennium.

After being staged at the Circus Tavern in Purfleet for 14 years, the tournament moved to the Alexandra Palace in London. The championships had been considered to have outgrown the Circus Tavern whose capacity of 800–900 spectators was considerably smaller than some Holsten Premier League darts events in 2007 which saw crowds reaching 5,000. The Alexandra Palace was the venue of the News of the World Darts Championship between 1963 and 1977 and boasts a capacity for 2008 of 2,500.

Format and qualifiers
The televised stages featured 68 players. The top 32 players in the PDC Order of Merit at 12 November 2007 received an automatic place in the World Championship. They were joined by 16 PDPA members and 20 international qualifiers determined by the PDC and PDPA.

The 16 PDPA members were made up from the top eight players (who had not already qualified) in the PDC Pro Tour Events during 2007: Jelle Klaasen, Mark Walsh, Tony Eccles, Michael van Gerwen, Steve Brown, Dave Askew, Jason Clark and Matt Clark.

The final eight qualifiers were determined at a PDPA Qualifying event which was held on 17 November 2007 in Wolverhampton – prior to the Grand Slam of Darts tournament. The successful players were Steve Maish, Jan van der Rassel, Colin Monk, Steve Evans, Jamie Caven, Steve Hine, Kirk Shepherd and Jason Barry. Former world champions John Lowe, Eric Bristow, Keith Deller and Richie Burnett all played in the qualifying rounds but failed to reach the televised stages.

Order of Merit

Pro Tour
  Jelle Klaasen
  Mark Walsh
  Michael van Gerwen
  Steve Brown
  Matt Clark
  Tony Eccles
  Dave Askew
  Jason Clark

PDPA Qualifiers
  Jamie Caven
  Kirk Shepherd
  Steve Hine
  Steve Maish
  Jason Barry
  Steve Evans
  Jan van der Rassel
  Colin Monk

PDC North American Pro Tour Order of MeritFirst Round Qualifiers
  Gary Mawson
  Ray Carver
  Gerry Convery
  Dan Olson

Dutch/Belgian DDF Order of MeritFirst Round Qualifiers
  Leroy Kwadijk
  Toon Greebe

German Darts Corporation Order of MeritFirst Round Qualifiers
  Mensur Suljović
  Michael Rosenauer

Danish Order of MeritFirst Round Qualifiers
  Per Laursen

Australia Order of MeritFirst Round Qualifiers
  Steve MacArthur

Oceanic Masters WinnerFirst Round Qualifiers
  Warren Parry

South African Open WinnerFirst Round Qualifiers
  Charles Losper

International QualifiersPreliminary Round Qualifiers
  Akihiro Nagakawa
  Anthony Forde
  Rizal Barellano
  Miloslav Navrátil
  Alan Bolton
  Erwin Extercatte
  Ashfaque Sayed
  Shi Yongsheng

Prize money
The 2008 World Championship featured a prize fund of £589,000. The prize money for earlier round losers was increased, whilst the winner and runner-up prize money was unchanged.

Draw

Preliminary round
(best of nine legs, played Wednesday 19 December and Thursday 20 December)
 Akihiro Nagakawa 68.85 2–5 Anthony Forde  69.83
 Rizal Barellano 68.58 0–5 Miloslav Navrátil  74.96
 Alan Bolton 60.38 0–5 Erwin Extercatte  63.15
 Ashfaque Sayed 72.03 0–5 Shi Yongsheng  78.28

Draw

Highest Checkouts: 170, Mervyn King, James Wade, Wayne Mardle

180's scored : 478

Most 180s Scored, Individual : 34 John Part, 33 Kirk Shepherd, 24 Wayne Mardle, 24 Kevin Painter, 22 Adrian Lewis.

Highest Tournament Dart Average (In A Single Match): John Part 99.06 vs Suljovic (second round).

Scores after player's names are three-dart averages (total points scored divided by darts thrown and multiplied by 3)

Statistics

Representation from different countries
This table shows the number of players by country in the World Championship, the total number including the preliminary round.

Tournament review

Day one

Alan Tabern 3–1 Per Laursen 
Mark Walsh 0–3 Adrian Gray 
Wayne Mardle 3–0 Ray Carver 
Jan van der Rassel 3–2 Colin Lloyd

Day two

Roland Scholten 3–0 Matt Clark 
Peter Manley 3–0 Toon Greebe 
Phil Taylor 3–2 Michael Van Gerwen 
Mervyn King 3–1 Michael Rosenauer

Day three, Wednesday 19 December

Jamie Caven 2–3 Wes Newton 
Denis Ovens 3–1 Colin Monk 
Mick Mcgowan 3–0 Jason Barry 
Barrie Bates 3–0 Gerry Convery
Jason Clark 3–2 Bob Anderson 
Kirk Shepherd 3–1 Terry Jenkins
Chris Mason 3–1 Steve Brown 
Kevin Painter 3–0 Gary Mawson

Day four, Thursday 20 December

Andy Jenkins 3–1 Miloslav Navrátil 
Tony Eccles 1–3 Wayne Jones 
Andy Hamilton 3–1 Leroy Kwadijk 
Alex Roy 3–0 Warren Parry 
Steve Maish 3–1 Dennis Priestley 
Adrian Lewis 3–1 Dave Askew 
Raymond Van Barneveld 3–0 Anthony Forde
Vincent Van Der Voort 3–2 Jelle Klaasen

Day five, Friday 21 December

Alan Warriner-Little 2–3 Shi Yongsheng 
Erwin Extercatte 0–3 Colin Osborne 
Mensur Suljovic 3–2 Andy Smith 
Steve Beaton 3–0 Steve Evans 
Ronnie Baxter 3–2 Dan Olson 
James Wade 3–0 Steve Macarthur 
John Part 3-1 Charles Losper 
Mark Dudbridge 3–1 Steve Hine

Alan Tabern 4–0 Andy Jenkins (3–1 3–1 3–1 3–0)
Jan Van Der Rassel 0–4 Denis Ovens (1–3 1–3 2–3 0–3)
Peter Manley 4–2 Shi Yongsheng ( 3–0 3–0 1–3 3–2 0–3 3–1)
Roland Scholten 0–4 Mervyn King ( 0–3 0–3 0–3 1–3)
Phil Taylor 4–1 Adrian Gray ( 1–3 3–0 3–2 3–2 3–0)
Wayne Mardle 4–2 Wes Newton (3–0 1–3 2–3 3–2 3–2 3–1)

Sunday 23 December to Tuesday 25 December
The tournament went into hiatus for the Christmas period.

Barrie Bates 2–4 Colin Osborne 3–1 2–3 2–3 1–3 3–1 0–3
Kevin Painter 4–0 Chris Mason 3–0 3–0 3–0 3–2 
Terry Jenkins 4–0 Mick Mcgowan 3–0 3–1 3–1 3–0 
Adrian Lewis 4–3 Vincent Van Der Voort 3–0 3–1 3–0 1–3 1–3 1–3 5–3 
John Part 4-1 Mensur Suljovic 3–1 3–1 1–3 3–1 3–1
James Wade 4–0 Steve Beaton 3–2 3–2 3–0 3–0

Day eight, Thursday 27 December

Wayne Jones 4–0 Steve Maish 3–1 3–0 3–0 3–2 
Alex Roy 1–4 Andy Hamilton 3–0 1–3 0–3 2–3 2–3 
Mark Dudbridge 2–4 Ronnie Baxter 2–3 2–3 3–1 1–3 3–0 0–3 
Raymond Van Barneveld 4–0 Jason Clark 3–0 3–0 3–0 1–3 3–1
Third Round (Last 16)
Phil Taylor 4–2 Alan Tabern 0–3 2–3 3–1 3–1 3–0 3–2
Wayne Mardle 4–1 Mervyn King 1–3 3–1 3–2 3–2 3–2

Day nine, Friday 28 December
Raymond van Barneveld's reign as PDC World Championship was ended by Kevin Painter in a thrilling match which Painter finished off with a ten-dart leg to clinch the match 4–2. Painter hit seven consecutive treble 20s, en route to a possible nine dart leg before missing a treble 19 before completing a remarkable ten darter to go through to the quarter-finals.

Earlier, James Wade overcame flu and Mark Dudbridge 4–2 to go through to his first World quarter-final and Kirk Shepherd defeated Barrie Bates 4–2 to be the surprise quarter-finalist. Peter Manley and John Part both had comfortable wins in their last 16 matches.

The talking point of the day may have been the Adrian Lewis v Tony Eccles clash. Eccles started in sensational fashion winning the first eight legs, but couldn't close out the third set. He missed two darts at a double for a 3–0 sets lead and then Lewis started a fightback winning the next three sets to lead 3–2. Eccles fought back himself to level the match, but controversy came in the final set when the scores were level at 2 legs each. Lewis took an unscheduled comfort break just minutes after a scheduled one and when he came back he found his rhythm to win the next two legs and make the quarter-finals.

Kirk Shepherd 4–2 Barrie Bates (3–0, 1–3, 3–2, 1–3, 3–2, 3–1)
Adrian Lewis 4–3 Tony Eccles (0–3, 0–3, 3–2, 3–0, 3–2, 1–3, 4–2)
James Wade 4–2 Mark Dudbridge (2–3, 3–1, 3–0, 3–2, 1–3, 3–2)
Peter Manley 4–1 Jan Van Der Rassel (2–3, 3–1, 3–2, 3–2, 3–1)
Kevin Painter 4–2 Raymond Van Barneveld (1–3, 3–0, 3–1, 0–3, 3–2, 3–2)
John Part 4-0 Alex Roy (3–1, 3–2, 3–1, 3–1)

Day ten, quarter-finals, Saturday 29 December
For the first time in the 15-year history of the event, Phil Taylor failed to make it to the final after losing to Wayne Mardle. Taylor took an early 3–0 lead, but after winning a set Mardle's confidence increased and with the crowd behind him brought it back to 3–3. With the sets tied 4–4 the legs went with throw until 4–4 when Mardle broke Taylor with tops after Taylor missed double sixteen when the dart went the wrong side of the wire. Wayne closed out the match on his own darts with 140 and double 18 to win the final set 6–4 and a 5–4 win. Mardle immediately broke down into tears after the win.  After the match Mardle said "it's not being in the semis that's important... it's beating that guy there (Taylor); he didn't play well, but I still had to play at my best to beat him"

Taylor said "When I was 3 sets to nil up, I thought I'm going to beat him 5–0... If he gets his game together now he's got the biggest chance of his life to win it".

World Matchplay champion James Wade also went out in the quarter-finals to two-time former World Champion John Part. It was a close match, but Part always stayed in front after establishing a 2–0 set lead. Wade did fight back from 1–3 to level the match.

Kirk Shepherd continued his amazing run and for the third time in the tournament survived his opponent having darts to win the match. Peter Manley had two darts to win the final set 3–0, but Shepherd came back to win the final set 4–2. After sharing the first four sets, Kevin Painter beat Adrian Lewis 5–2.

Kirk Shepherd 5–4 Peter Manley (3–0, 2–3, 3–2, 2–3, 1–3, 3–1, 2–3, 3–1, 4–2)
John Part 5-4 James Wade (3–2, 3–0, 1–3, 3–1, 2–3, 1–3, 3–1, 0–3, 4–2)
Wayne Mardle 5–4 Phil Taylor (0–3, 1–3, 0–3, 3–0, 3–1, 3–2, 2–3, 3–1, 6–4)
Kevin Painter 5–2 Adrian Lewis (3–0, 2–3, 3–0, 1–3, 3–0, 3–1, 3–2)

Day Eleven, Semi-finals, Sunday 30 December
Kirk Shepherd's sensational run in the tournament continued as he beat Wayne Mardle in the semi-final to reach the final. Shepherd, the 21-year-old qualifier built up a 3–1 set lead and missed five darts to go 4–1 up only to see Mardle come back to take the lead 4–3. Mardle, who had beaten Phil Taylor the previous night in the quarter-finals looked to be on his way to his first world final before Shepherd fought back again to take the next three sets and become the first qualifier to reach the PDC World final.

The other semi-final was a more clinical performance as John Part returned to the final always having the edge over 2004 finalist Kevin Painter. The fourth set was potential decisive as Painter missed darts to take a 2–0 leg lead. Part then took out the next two legs and a 13-darter in the fourth leg gave him a 3–1 set lead. Painter missed a dart at bullseye to bring the score back to 2–3, leaving Part a 44 finish to go 4–1 up – then also missed a chance to take the sixth set. Part took the match with a classy 130 finish for a 6–2 win.
 
Kirk Shepherd 6–4 Wayne Mardle (0–3, 3–0, 3–2, 3–2, 2–3, 1–3, 2–3, 3–2, 3–1, 3–2)
John Part 6-2 Kevin Painter (3–2, 3–2, 0–3, 3–1, 3–2, 3–2, 0–3, 3–2)

Day Twelve, Final, Tuesday 1 January 2008
John Part became World Champion for the third time with a ruthless 7–2 victory over qualifier Kirk Shepherd. Shepherd had beaten world number four Terry Jenkins, three time world finalist Peter Manley and Phil Taylor's conqueror Wayne Mardle to become the first qualifier to reach the PDC World final – but he had no answer to Part's experience in the final. The early stages of the match were close with both of the first two sets going down to a deciding leg. Part just edged the first set and in the deciding leg of the second started with 140, 180 and a 15-dart leg for a 2–0 lead. Part then ran off the next six legs to find himself 4–0 in front and missed a bullseye for a 5–0 lead before Shepherd took his first set. The sixth set again went to last leg with Part re-establishing a four set lead but Shepherd continued to battle away and took the seventh set with a brilliant 160 finish. Part opened the eighth set with a 139 finish, then Shepherd hit an 88 to level it before checkouts of 52 and 80 from Part took him one set away from victory at 6–2. The Canadian closed out victory in the ninth set with a double ten in the fifth leg.

John Part 7-2 Kirk Shepherd (3–2, 3–2, 3–0, 3–0, 2–3, 3–2, 2–3, 3–1, 3–2)

Trivia 
 Kirk Shepherd became the youngest player to ever reach a Darts World Championship (PDC or BDO) final.
 No one in the tournament achieved a match average of over 100, for the first time since 1995.
 As a result of Phil Taylor not advancing past the quarter-final stages, Raymond van Barneveld became the world number one.
 The tournament saw the first ever PDC World Championship final without the presence of Phil Taylor.
 None of the 4 semi-finalists from this tournament, the first at Alexandra Palace, have played at World Championship since the 2019 edition with Mardle not having qualified since 2010, Shepherd since 2011, champion Part since 2015, and Painter who failed to qualify in 2019 for the first time since 2001.
 John Part became the first player to win the world championship in three different venues – having won the 1994 BDO World Championship at the Lakeside, the 2003 PDC title at the Circus Tavern and in 2008 at Alexandra Palace.

References

External links
 Article on Hearn's future plans BBC London
 Qualifying for the 2008 World Championships Darts Database

2008
PDC World Darts Championships 2008
PDC World Darts Championships 2008
PDC World Darts Championship
PDC World Darts Championship
PDC World Darts Championship
PDC World Darts Championship
PDC World Darts Championship
PDC World Darts Championship
PDC World Darts Championship
Alexandra Palace